The list of shipwrecks in June 1829 includes some ships sunk, wrecked or otherwise lost during June 1829.

1 June

2 June

4 June

6 June

10 June

13 June

14 June

15 June

22 June

23 June

24 June

27 June

28 June

Unknown date

References

1829-06